Kurt Lycjner was a Swedish sprint canoer who competed in the early 1970s. He won a bronze medal in the K-4 10000 m event at the 1970 ICF Canoe Sprint World Championships in Copenhagen.

References

Living people
Swedish male canoeists
Year of birth missing (living people)
ICF Canoe Sprint World Championships medalists in kayak